Crioceras is an extinct cephalopod genus belonging to the subclass Ammonoidea and included in the family Crioceratidae of the ammonitid superfamily Ancylocerataceae. Crioceras is considered by some to be a junior synonym of Crioceratites

Crioceras ramoseptum is a heteromorph that comes from the Aptian of Dagestan.

References 

Early Cretaceous ammonites of North America
Hauterivian life
Ammonitida genera